Hoe Bridge School is an independent co-educational, pre-prep and prep school in Woking, England. At its last full inspection in 2014 it was rated excellent by the Independent Schools Inspectorate. The school was established in 1986 following the merger of two former proprietorial boys schools, Allen House and St Michael's School. In 1987 it became a charitable trust administered by a board of governors, and developed to include girls up to Year 6 in 1999. The school is based in a seventeenth century house and is set in its own grounds in Woking, Surrey.

Site and facilities
Hoe Place is a former mansion which is home to the Hoe Bridge Prep department. It dates from 1680 and was a favourite retreat of Lady Castlemaine, a mistress of King Charles II.

The chapel, which houses teaching and music rooms, dates back to 1850 and has an original ice house in the gardens. The mansion remained a private residence until the 1920s, when Hoe Place Preparatory School was established in 1928 and in turn, became St. Michael's School in 1964.

Hoe Bridge School itself was formed in 1986 when St Michael's School merged with Allen House Preparatory School which had been founded at Box Grove near Guildford, then on part of the present Royal Grammar School site. In 2019 the school opened a new performing arts facility.

Activities
The school sponsors a girls' field hockey team.

Notable alumni
Rufus Hound, comedian

References

External links

Preparatory schools in Surrey
Woking
Educational institutions established in 1986
1986 establishments in England